Eresiomera phillipi is a butterfly in the family Lycaenidae. It is found in the Central African Republic and possibly the Republic of the Congo.

References

Endemic fauna of the Central African Republic
Butterflies described in 1998
Poritiinae